Illacme is a genus of millipedes in the family Siphonorhinidae. It includes two species. Illacme plenipes was first described in 1928 from San Benito County, California, and rediscovered in 2005.

References

Sources

 

Siphonophorida
Millipede genera
Endemic fauna of California